Faust and Marguerite is a 1900 American silent film produced and distributed by Edison Manufacturing Company. It was directed by Edwin S. Porter and based on the Michel Carré play Faust et Marguerite and the 1859 opera Faust adapted from the play by Charles Gounod.

Plot
The 1901 Edison Films Catalog describes the film:
Marguerite is seated before the fireplace, Faust standing by her side. Mephistopheles enters and offers his sword to Faust, commanding him to behead the fair Marguerite. Faust refuses, whereupon Mephistopheles draws the sword across the throat of the lady and she suddenly disappears and Faust is seated in her place.

References

External links

Faust and Marguerite via Library of Congress

American silent short films
1900 films
1900 horror films
Films based on Goethe's Faust
Films directed by Edwin S. Porter
American black-and-white films
Fiction about skeletons
1900s American films
Silent horror films